SK-1 or SK1 may refer to:

 Casio SK-1, a small sampling keyboard
 Garant 30k SK-1, an East German armored vehicle
 Hammond SK1, a modern keyboard
 SK-1 spacesuit, an early Russian spacesuit
 sK1 (program), a fork of the Skencil vector graphics editor
 Sphingosine kinase 1, a protein
 SK1 (film), a 2014 French film
 VR Class Sk1, a locomotive class

See also

 SKL (disambiguation)
 ski (disambiguation)
 SK (disambiguation)